The Earth Transformed: An Untold History is a 2023 non-fiction book by English historian Peter Frankopan. It discusses the interactions between human societies and the environment throughout history. Frankopan argues that droughts, volcanic eruptions, the Little Ice Age, Medieval Warm Period and contemporary climate change impacted and coincided with societal change, such as the Classic Maya collapse and expansion of the Mongol Empire. 

Walter Scheidel gave the book a positive review in Financial Times. The Times and Geographical also published positive reviews.

References 

2023 non-fiction books
Environmental non-fiction books
Climate change books
21st-century history books
Environmental history